Skitch may refer to:

 Skitch - As in Skitch-Burn from the 80’s as told by O’Reilly 
 Skitching, hitching a ride on a car's bumper while skateboarding, or in the snow
 Jeffrey Skitch (1927–2013), Australian-British singer, actor and teacher
 William Skitch (1860–1944), New Zealand cricketer
 Skitch Henderson (1918–2005), American pianist, conductor, and composer
 Mr. Skitch, a 1933 American comedy film
 A screenshot editing and sharing utility, part of the Evernote app

See also
 Skitchin', a 1994 racing video game